Neuenstein may refer to:

 Neuenstein, Baden-Württemberg
 Neuenstein, Hesse, a community in Hersfeld-Rotenburg district in northeastern Hesse, Germany
 Hohenlohe-Neuenstein, a German princely dynasty
 Philip of Hohenlohe-Neuenstein (1550–1606), army commander for Dutch Republic
 Georg Friedrich of Hohenlohe-Neuenstein-Weikersheim (1569–1645), officer and amateur poet

See also 
 Joshua Neustein (born 1940)
 Altenstein (disambiguation)